Joaquín Sánchez may refer to:

 Joaquín Sánchez de Toca (1852–1942), Spanish conservative politician and former prime minister
 Joaquín Sánchez Rodríguez (born 1981), Spanish footballer and Real Betis player
 Joaquín Sánchez (Colombian footballer) (1941–2020), Colombian footballer